Dustin Butler  (born December 30, 1987) is a Canadian ice hockey goaltender.

He played fives seasons (2008–2013) for the University of Calgary in the CWUAA conference of Canadian Interuniversity Sport (CIS). For his outstanding play during the 2010–11 season, Butler was selected as the 2010–11 CIS Goaltender of the Year, and was also named to the 2010–11 CIS All-Canadian First Team.

On April 10, 2013, the Vancouver Canucks signed Butler to a try-out contract and he dressed as an emergency backup to Roberto Luongo for their National Hockey League game that same day against the Calgary Flames. He nearly got a chance to have a little ice time at the end of the game, but didn't get a stoppage in play for him to get in.

Awards and honours

References

External links

1987 births
Canadian ice hockey left wingers
Ice hockey people from Alberta
Kamloops Blazers players
Living people
People from High River
Portland Winterhawks players
Prince Albert Raiders players